Marwood is a village in North Devon  north of Barnstaple. The village contains  of ornamental gardens open to the public, known as Marwood Hill Gardens. The gardens were developed by Jimmy Smart, who died in 2002. There is a tea-room.

An electoral ward with the same name exists whose population at the 2011 census was 1,879.

On an island in the middle lake at Marwood Hill Gardens is a sculpture of a mother and children by John Robinson, who also sculpted the font-cover in the 13th-century church at Marwood. A bronze sculpture of two swans arising from the lower lake was created by Jonathan Cox.

References

External links

Villages in Devon